South Terminal is a 2019 French drama film directed by Rabah Ameur-Zaïmeche. It was screened in the Contemporary World Cinema section at the 2019 Toronto International Film Festival.

Cast
 Ramzy Bedia
 Amel Brahim-Djelloul
 Slimane Dazi
 Vanessa Liautey
 Jacques Nolot

References

External links
 

2019 films
2019 drama films
French drama films
2010s French-language films
2010s French films